Kvam may refer to:

People
Adolph Kvam (1917-2006), an American politician and businessman
Isaac J. Kvam (1864-1917), an American Lutheran minister and elected official
Kela Kvam (1931–2019), a Danish academic and writer
Kolbjørn Kvam (1865-1933), a Norwegian sports shooter
Ragnar Kvam (1917-2006), a Norwegian journalist, novelist, translator and literary critic
Ragnar Kvam Jr. (born 1942), a Norwegian journalist, globetrotter, biographer and non-fiction writer

Places

Norway
 Kvam, a municipality in Hordaland county
 Kvam, Nord-Trøndelag, a former municipality in the old Nord-Trøndelag county
 Kvam, Steinkjer, a village in Steinkjer municipality in Trøndelag county
 Kvam, Innlandet, a village in Nord-Fron municipality in Innlandet county
 Kvam Station, a railway station in Nord-Fron municipality in Innlandet county
 Kvam Church, a church in Steinkjer municipality in Trøndelag county
 Kvam Church (Nord-Fron), a church in Nord-Fron municipality in Innlandet county

See also
 KVAM, a list of radio stations with the call sign KVAM